Helmuth Brückner (7 May 1896 – 12 January 1951?) was Gauleiter of the National Socialist German Workers Party (NSDAP) in Silesia from 1925 until 1934, when he fell out of political favor.

Life
Helmuth Brückner was born on 7 May 1896 in Peilau (Prussia).  He attended Volkschule in Peilau, Höhere Knabenschule in Langenbielau, and Kgl. Realgymnasium in Reichenbach. He then studied at Schlesische Friedrich-Wilhelms-Universität zu Breslau (today, the University of Wrocław).
  
In 1914, Brückner volunteered for the Army and was posted with the Feld-Artillerie-Regiment 88 where he won the Iron Cross 2nd and 1st Class as Leutnant der Reserve and Abteilung-Adjutant.  On 25 March 1918 he was seriously wounded while in France. In 1921 he was Ib–Gruppe Nord with the Deutschen Selbstschutz (Freikorps) in Oberschlesien.

He participated in the failed “Beer Hall Putsch” on 9 November 1923, was briefly detained, tried and released on probation. In 1924, Brückner joined the National Socialist Freedom Movement (the NSDAP had been banned after the failed putsch) and became editor of Schlesien Volksstimme.  He also became Stadtverordneter (City Councilor) in Breslau, a position he held until 1926.

Brückner organized the NSDAP in Silesia; on 15 March 1925 he officially joined the refounded NSDAP (number 2,023) and was appointed Gauleiter for Gau Silesia.  It was at this time he also founded the publishing house NS-Schlesien which published the “Schlesischen Beobachters”. In September 1925, he became a member of the National Socialist Working Association, a short-lived group of north and northwest German Gauleiter, organized and led by Gregor Strasser, which unsuccessfully sought to amend the Party program. It was dissolved in 1926 following the Bamberg Conference. In September 1930 he was elected a member of the Reichstag for electoral constituency 7, Breslau, and on 24 April 1932 he became a member of the Landtag of Prussia. On 17 August 1932 Brückner was named Landesinspekteur-East charged with oversight responsibility for three eastern Gaue (Silesia, Danzig and East Prussia).  This was a short-lived initiative by  Strasser to centralize control over the Gaue. However, it was unpopular with the Gauleiters and was repealed on Strasser's fall from power in December 1932. Bruckner then returned to his Gauleiter position in Silesia.

On 12 March 1933 Brückner became Provinzial-Landtagsabgeordneter, Kreistagsabgeordneter and Stadtverordneter. On 25 March 1933 he was named to the Prussian State Council (Preußischen Staatsrat) and became the acting Oberpräsident of the Prussian Province of Lower Silesia (made permanent on 2 August). On 29 May he was similarly named acting Oberpräsident of the Prussian Province of Upper Silesia (made permanent on 1 June). He thus united under his control the highest party and governmental offices in the two provinces. On 7 October 1933 he was promoted to Gruppenführer in the Sturmabteilung (SA).
 
He was accused of homosexual activity under Paragraph 175, but he argued that he was bisexual, and that his mutual masturbation with another officer was a normal activity, and was not immediately convicted. However, he was dismissed as Gauleiter on 4 December 1934, removed from his government posts on 12 December and on 25 December he was expelled from the NSDAP in connection with the "Röhm Putsch".

From 1938, Brückner was working as an industrial worker in the Heinkel works in Rostock.  He was politically rehabilitated.

Arrested by the Soviets in July 1945, he was confined in a prison camp in Thuringia until 1949, then moved to the USSR where he was also in various internment camps. There is some uncertainty surrounding his date of death, as official sources give the year of his death as both 1951 and 1954, and appear to hide the specific date and place.

Decorations and awards
 Honour Cross of the World War 1914/1918
 Wound Badge
 Iron Cross of 1914, 1st and 2nd class
 Silesian Eagle, 1st and 2nd class

References

External links
“Reichstags-Handbuch VIII.Wahlperiode 1933” (Berlin: Druck und Verlag der Reichsdruckerei, p. 107)

1896 births
1954 deaths
Bisexual men
Gauleiters
German Army personnel of World War I
German newspaper editors
German people imprisoned abroad
German people who died in Soviet detention
German bisexual people
LGBT people in the Nazi Party
Members of the Reichstag of the Weimar Republic
Members of the Reichstag of Nazi Germany
National Socialist Freedom Movement politicians
National Socialist Working Association members
Nazi Party officials
Nazi Party politicians
Nazis who participated in the Beer Hall Putsch
People from Dzierżoniów County
Politicians from the Province of Silesia
Recipients of the Iron Cross (1914), 1st class
Sturmabteilung officers
20th-century Freikorps personnel
20th-century German newspaper publishers (people)
University of Wrocław alumni